Brandon Alexander Mason (born 30 September 1997) is an English professional footballer who plays as a defender for  club Crawley Town.

Club career

Watford
A graduate of the Watford youth system, Mason was handed a professional contract ahead of the 2016–17 season. He made his Premier League debut for Watford on 1 January 2017 in a 4–1 home defeat against Tottenham Hotspur. He then made his first start for Watford in their FA Cup fixture against Burton Albion six days later, setting up a goal for Christian Kabasele.

In January 2018, Mason joined Scottish Championship club Dundee United until the end of the 2017–18 season. He made his debut in a 6–1 defeat at Falkirk on 6 January, but made only one further appearance for the club. He was later released by Watford at the end of the season.

Coventry City
In July 2018, Mason signed a two-year contract with newly-promoted League One club Coventry City. He played his first match for the "Sky Blues" on 4 August 2018 in a 2–1 home defeat to Scunthorpe United. In September 2019 he signed a new three-year contract with Coventry. Mason joined Scottish Premiership club St Mirren on a season-long loan on 5 October 2020 and went on to make 13 appearances in all competitions. He was released by Coventry City in August 2021.

Milton Keynes Dons
On 18 March 2022, Mason joined League One club Milton Keynes Dons on a short-term contract, primarily as cover for left wing-back Daniel Harvie. He failed to make a single appearance for the club and was later one of six players released at the end of the 2021–22 season.

Crawley Town
Mason signed for EFL League Two club Crawley Town on a two-year deal in July 2022 following a trial spell at the club.

Career statistics

References

External links
Brandon Mason profile at the Coventry F.C. website

1997 births
Living people
English footballers
Footballers from Westminster
Association football defenders
Premier League players
Watford F.C. players
Dundee United F.C. players
Coventry City F.C. players
Milton Keynes Dons F.C. players
St Mirren F.C. players
Crawley Town F.C. players
English Football League players
Scottish Professional Football League players
Black British sportspeople